Parodi may refer to:

Parodi's hemispingus, a species of bird endemic to Peru

Places
Parodi, Beed, a village in Ashti Taluka, Beed District, Maharashtra, India
Parodi, Pune, a village in Shirur Taluka, Pune District, Maharashtra, India
Parodi Ligure, a commune in northwest Italy

People
Alexandre Parodi (1901–1979), French diplomat and ambassador to the United Nations
Carlos Carrillo Parodi, Peruvian microbiologist
Cristina Parodi (born 1964), Italian journalist and television host
Delia Parodi (1913–1991), Argentine politician
Filippo Parodi (1630–1702), Italian sculptor
Franco Parodi (born 1989), Argentine football player
Giovanni Battista Parodi (1674–1730), Italian painter
Giulio Parodi (born 1997), Italian football player
José Parodi (1932–2006), Paraguayan football coach and player
Juan C. Parodi (born 1942), Argentinian vascular surgeon and activist to alleviate poverty
Juan Martín Parodi (born 1964), Uruguayan football player
Mario Parodi (1917–1970), Italian classical guitarist
Les Parodi (born 1954), English football defender
Lucas Parodi (born 1990), Argentine football player
Pasquale Parodi (born 1909), Italian football player and coach
Simone Parodi (born 1986), Italian volleyball player
Starr Parodi, American composer and musician
Teresa Parodi (born 1947), Argentine singer-songwriter
William Parodi (born 1973), Panamanian prosecutor

See also
Parody, a lampoon
Parodi (film), Kannada film
Gina Parody (born 1973), a Colombian lawyer and politician
Dyson Parody (born 1984), a Gibraltarian darts player